Photography in Bangladesh began with the creation of Bangladesh through the liberation war of 1971, against Pakistan. At the time, inevitably, war time photography was of utmost prominence, which has also largely helped document history. Since the war, photography and photojournalism have come to include and cover a large array of subjects including landscape, politics, wildlife, fashion etc.

Photography was introduced and developed as an institutional and academic discipline through personal efforts, without any significant assistance or support from the government.

Bangladesh liberation 
Photography during the liberation war predominantly documented two things: the tyranny, abuse and genocide carried out by the Pakistani army; and the preparation, training and struggle of the people, largely civilians, for freedom. Some of Pakistan's notable photographers of that time are Aftab Ahmed, Naib Uddin Ahmed, Manzoor Alam Beg, Amanul Haque, Anwar Hossain,  and Rashid Talukder, among others.

Post independence 
"Since the liberation of Bangladesh in 1971 the socio– economic, political, cultural, educational and technical aspects of photography have gradually been transformed. This process of transformation is distinctive in terms of chronology, theme and genre, besides which various individual characteristics of various photographers also became stronger."

Photographic organizations which were active or created after independence include Camera Recreation Club (CRC), Bangladesh Photographic Society (BPS),  Alokchitra Silpi Samsad (ASS), Chittagong Photographic Society (CPS), Bangladesh Alokchitra Federation (BAF), Drik Picture Library Limited, MAP Agency of Photography (MAP), Aalok Group of Photographers, Bangladesh Photographic Council (BPC), Bangladesh Photographic Association (BPA) and Bangladesh Photographers Welfare Association. These organizations helped the growth and development of photography and supported local photographers in their endeavors, through arranging competitions, exhibitions, contests on a national level, and through providing training, workshops, libraries, darkrooms, etc.

Notes and references

Notes

References